Tibor Benkő (born 16 October 1955) is a Hungarian military officer and government official. He served as the Minister of Defence from 2018 to 2022. He previously was a four-star general in the Hungarian Defence Forces, serving as Chief of the Defence Staff from 6 June 2010 until 16 May 2018.

Following the 2018 parliamentary election, General Benkő was nominated by Prime Minister Viktor Orbán to serve as Minister of Defence, it was alleged that he would be both a soldier and a minister.

Personal life
General Benkő is married and has two daughters.

Decorations
 Commander of the Legion of Merit (2012)

References

External links

 Official CV

1955 births
Living people
People from Nyíregyháza
Hungarian generals
Hungarian soldiers
Government ministers of Hungary
Defence ministers of Hungary
Recipients of the Order of Merit of the Republic of Hungary
Commanders of the Legion of Merit
Members of the Fourth Orbán Government